Te'a Omari Cooper (born April 16, 1997) is an American professional basketball player who is a free agent in the Women's National Basketball Association (WNBA).  She played for the Los Angeles Sparks . She played college basketball for the Baylor Lady Bears, South Carolina Gamecocks, and the Tennessee Volunteers.

High school career
Cooper played high school basketball for McEachern High School. In her freshman year, McEachern High School was undefeated as they finished 33–0. She shot 65 percent from the field. She won three Georgia 6A State titles in 2012, 2014 and 2015, and she was the co-MVP of the 2015 McDonald's All-America game.

Professional career
On April 17, 2020, the Phoenix Mercury selected Cooper as the 18th pick in the 2020 WNBA Draft. Due to the global pandemic from COVID-19, Phoenix Mercury were forced to cut some of their players from the team in May 2020, including Te'a Cooper. The Los Angeles Sparks team took this as an opportunity to transfer some of the Phoenix Mercury players to play for them, and Cooper was picked to play as a point guard. From her previous college 3-point range (56-of-135 for 41.5%), can prove to the Sparks coach, Derek Fisher, how well of a point guard and shooter she can provide for his team, despite her being a rookie. Cooper continues to gain experience and skills from the other players in the Los Angeles Sparks team. Cooper's current average for about 17 minutes in a game consists of making around 7.3 points and having about 2 assists. On August 13, 2020, the Los Angeles Sparks played against the Washington Mystics, leading Cooper to have one of her best games of the season with 10 points (5-of-6 shooting) with 3 assists, all within 19 minutes of playing time.

Career statistics

WNBA

Regular season

|-
| align="left" | 2020
| align="left" | Los Angeles
| 20 || 3 || 17.0 || .451 || .344 || .765 || 1.0 || 2.0 || 0.7 || 0.0 || 1.5 || 7.0
|-
| align="left" | 2021
| align="left" | Los Angeles
| 28 || 11 || 21.0 || .349 || .306 || .779 || 1.8 || 1.2 || 0.9 || 0.2 || 1.8 || 8.0
|-
| align="left" | Career
|
| 48 || 14 || 19.4 || .384 || .319 || .799 || 1.4 || 1.7 || 0.8 || 0.1 || 1.6 || 7.6
|}

Playoffs

|-
| align="left" | 2020
| align="left" | Los Angeles
| 1 || 0 || 21.0 || .250 || .500  || .000 || 0.0 || 2.0 || 1.0 || 0.0 || 3.0 || 3.0
|-
| align="left" | Career
|
| 1 || 0 || 21.0 || .250 || .500 || .000 || 0.0 || 2.0 || 1.0 || 0.0 || 3.0 || 3.0
|}

College

Source

Personal life
Te'a Cooper is the daughter of Omar and Kindall Cooper. She has three siblings: Mia (Imani) and twins Sharife and Omar. Sharife was drafted by the Atlanta Hawks in 2021.

Te'a dated Dwight Howard and the pair became engaged in 2019. In 2021, Cooper and Howard parted ways. Cooper is currently dating New Orleans Saints running back Alvin Kamara.

References

1997 births
Living people
American women's basketball players
Basketball players from Georgia (U.S. state)
Basketball players from New Jersey
Baylor Bears women's basketball players
Los Angeles Sparks players
McDonald's High School All-Americans
Parade High School All-Americans (girls' basketball)
People from Montclair, New Jersey
Phoenix Mercury draft picks
Point guards